Helicostylum is a genus of two species of fungi in the family Mucoraceae.

References

External links

Mucoraceae
Zygomycota genera
Taxa named by August Carl Joseph Corda
Taxa described in 1842